Dialton is an unincorporated community in Clark County, in the U.S. state of Ohio.

History
Dialton had its start in 1851 when a sawmill was built there. A post office called Dialton was established in 1865, and remained in operation until 1901. The community was named for Judge Dial, who was instrumental in securing the post office for the town.

References

Unincorporated communities in Clark County, Ohio
1851 establishments in Ohio
Populated places established in 1851
Unincorporated communities in Ohio